Linda Brown may refer to:

 Linda Carol Brown (1943–2018), daughter of plaintiff Oliver Brown known for the landmark court case Brown v. Board of Education
 Linda Beatrice Brown (born 1939), African American author and educator

See also
Rae Linda Brown (1953–2017), American musicologist